M4 or M-4 most often refers to:
 M4 carbine, an American carbine
 M4 Sherman, an American World War II medium tank

M4, M04, or M-4 may also refer to:

Arts and entertainment 

 M4 (EP), a 2006 EP by Faunts
 M4 (video game), a 1992 computer game developed for the Macintosh
 M.IV ("Matrix IV"), the fictional Warner Brothers videogame project inside the 2021 film The Matrix Resurrections

Military

Weapons 

 Benelli M4 Super 90, an Italian semi-automatic shotgun
 M4 cannon, an American 37 mm automatic gun
 M4 Selectable Lightweight Attack Munition (SLAM), an American land mine
 M4 SLBM, a French submarine-launched ballistic missile from 1985
 M4 Survival Rifle, an American rifle in aircraft survival gear
 Spectre M4, an Italian submachine gun
 M4 bayonet, an American World War II bayonet used for the M1 Carbine
 Gross-Basenach M IV, a pre-WWI German military semi-rigid airship

Aircraft, ships and vehicles 

 , a 1980 Swedish Navy minelayer, later redesignated as ocean patrol vessel P04
 , a Swedish Navy mine sweeper
  (M4), a WWI British Royal Navy monitor
 , a British M-class submarine
 M4 Tractor, a U.S. Army artillery tractor from 1943
 Myasishchev M-4, a 1950s Soviet strategic bomber aircraft
 Meusel M-IV, a German glider; see List of German gliders

Other uses in military 

 M4 flame fuel thickening compound, a substance used in fire bombs and incendiary weapons
 M4 (German Navy 4-rotor Enigma), a variant of the Enigma cryptography machine
 M04, desert variant of M05, a camouflage pattern used by the Finnish Defence Forces

Science and technology

Biology, medicine and organic chemistry 

 ATC code M04, Antigout preparations, a subgroup of the Anatomical Therapeutic Chemical Classification System
 British NVC community M4, a type of mire plant community in the British National Vegetation Classification system
 M4, the FAB classification of acute myelomonocytic leukemia
 Muscarinic acetylcholine receptor M4, a protein

Computing and electronics 

 m4 (computer language), a macro processing language
 M4, part number for a 1N400x general purpose diode
 Sony Xperia M4 Aqua, a mobile phone
 ARM Cortex-M#Cortex-M4, a processor family

Other uses in science and technology 

 Messier 4 (M4), a globular cluster in the Scorpius constellation of stars
 Leica M4, a 1967 35 mm camera
 M4, an  ISO metric screw thread
 Foton-M No.4, a Russian microgravity and bioscience research spacecraft launched in July 2014

Transportation

Air 

 Covington Municipal Airport (Tennessee), FAA location identifier M04
 Maule M-4, a 1960 American four-seat cabin monoplane aircraft
 Miles M.4 Merlin, a 1930s British five-seat cabin monoplane aircraft

Rail 

 Bucharest Metro Line M4, Romania
 Line 4 (Budapest Metro), Metro 4 or M4, Hungary
 M4 (Copenhagen), a future expansion of the Copenhagen Metro, Denmark
 M4 (Istanbul Metro), a subway line on the Asian side of Istanbul, Turkey
 M4, variant of M2 (railcar), an American  railcar on the Metro-North Railroad
 Milan Metro Line 4, rapid transit line in Milan, Italy
 Sri Lanka Railways M4, a class of diesel-electric locomotive

Road 

 BMW M4, a car
 M4 Vacamatic, a 1941 semi-automatic transmission made by Chrysler
 M4, a bus route of Fifth and Madison Avenues Line, New York City, U.S.
 Mid-engine, four-wheel-drive layout, or M4 layout, an automotive design
 List of M4 roads

Other uses 

 Héctor David Delgado Santiago (1975–2013, alias El Metro 4, sometimes M4), deceased Mexican drug lord
 M4,  a measure of money supply
 M4-, M4+ and M4x, disciplines in men's rowing
 MLBB M4 World Championship, the fourth esports world championship for the mobile game Mobile Legends: Bang Bang held in 2023
 M4, a difficulty grade in mixed climbing

See also 

 
 
 MIV (disambiguation)
 4M (disambiguation)